Morondo is a town in north-western Ivory Coast. It is a sub-prefecture and commune of Kani Department in Worodougou Region, Woroba District.
In 2014, the population of the sub-prefecture of Morondo was 15,753.

Villages
The nine villages of the sub-prefecture of Morondo and their population in 2014 are:
 Fingolo (1 403)
 Kokodjimono (162)
 Morondo (3 839)
 Séfrédjo (1 155)
 Diomandougou (2 040)
 Hermankono (1 197)
 Kologo (2 611)
 Notou (2 587)
 Sétoumou (759)

Notes

Sub-prefectures of Worodougou
Communes of Worodougou